Abel Korzeniowski (born 18 July 1972) is a Polish composer of film and theatre scores.

Life and career
Korzeniowski was born in Kraków. He had contact with music from early childhood: his mother Barbara plays the cello and both his brothers Antoni and Andrzej are musicians. He graduated from the Academy of Music in Kraków majoring in cello and composer studies under the supervision of Krzysztof Penderecki.  He won acclaim as the composer of music for films and theatre plays and received a Ludwik Award (Nagroda Ludwika) in 2009.

Korzeniowski is a composer of film scores for several Polish films: Big Animal, Tomorrow's Weather, An Angel in Krakow, as well as Hollywood productions: Battle for Terra, Pu-239, Tickling Leo, A Single Man and W.E..

He won a San Diego Film Critics Society Award in 2009 for the Best score in A Single Man and was nominated for a 2009 Golden Globe in the best original score category for the same film. In 2012, he was nominated for Best Original Score for the film W.E., at the 69th Golden Globe Awards.

In 2012, Korzeniowski arranged Patricia Kaas’s album, Kaas chante Piaf, which was recorded as a tribute to Edith Piaf.

Works
 Emily (2022)
 Till (2022)
The Courier (2020)
The Nun (2018)
Nocturnal Animals (2016)
A Grain of Truth (2014)
Penny Dreadful (2014–16) (television series)
Romeo & Juliet (2013)
Escape from Tomorrow (2013)
Kaas chante Piaf (2012)
W.E. (2012)
Copernicus' Star (2011)
A Single Man (2009)
Tickling Leo (2009)
Confessions of a Go-Go Girl (2008)
What We Take from Each Other (2008)
Battle for Terra (2007)
Pu-239 (2007)
Metropolis (new score 2004)  
Tomorrow's Weather (2003)
An Angel in Cracow (2002)
The Big Animal (2000)

Awards and nominations

Awards
2015 British Academy Television Craft Awards (BAFTA) for Best Original Television Music – Penny Dreadful
2013 International Film Music Critics Association (IFMCA) for Film Composer of the Year – Romeo and Juliet, Escape from Tomorrow
2013 International Film Music Critics Association (IFMCA) for Best Original Score for a Drama Film – Romeo and Juliet
2013 International Film Music Critics Association (IFMCA) for Film Score of the Year – Romeo and Juliet
2011 CUE Awards 2011 Best Dramatic Score and Best Cue on Soundtrack – W.E. ("Dance for Me, Wallis"). 
2010 World Soundtrack Award 2010 Public Choice and Discovery Of The Year – A Single Man
2010 The International Cinephile Society 2010 (ICS) for Best Original Score – A Single Man
2010 AFT Awards 2010 for Best Original Score – A Single Man
2009 International Film Music Critics Association (IFMCA) for Best Original Score for a Drama Film – A Single Man
2009 San Diego Film Critics Society 2009 for Best Score – A Single Man
2005 Golden Knight Award 2005 for Best Composer  – Tomorrow's Weather
2002 Jancio Wodnik Award 2002 for Best Music – An Angel in Cracow
2002 Ludwik Award 2002 for Best Music for Theater Play – Kafka

Nominations
2016 Anthony Asquith Award for Best Original Score for the film – Nocturnal Animals
2015 IFMCA Award Nominations 2014 for Best Original Score for a Television Series – Penny Dreadful
2011 Golden Globe Nominations 2012 for Best Original Score – W.E.
2011 IFMCA Award Nominations 2011 for Best Original Score for a Drama Film – W.E.
2010 World Soundtrack Academy 2010 for Best Original Film Score of the Year – A Single Man
2009 Golden Globe Award for Best Original Score - A Single Man
2001 Golden Ducks Award 2001 for Best Film Composer
2000 Golden Lions Award 2000 for Best Music for Film – The Big Animal

References

External links 

 Official Website
 
 Interview with Abel Korzeniowski about his career until 2009

1972 births
Living people
Musicians from Kraków
Polish composers
Polish film score composers
Male film score composers
Alumni of the Academy of Music in Kraków